A telecentric lens is a special optical lens (often an objective lens or a camera lens) that has its entrance or exit pupil, or both, at infinity. Telecentric lenses are often used for precision optical two-dimensional measurements or reproduction and other applications that are sensitive to the image magnification or the angle of incidence of light.

The simplest way to make a lens telecentric is to put the aperture stop at one of the lens's focal points. This makes the chief rays (light rays that pass through the center of the aperture) on the other side of the lens parallel to the optical axis for any point in the field of view. Commercially available telecentric lenses are often compound lenses that include multiple lens elements, for improved optical performance. Telecentricity is not a property of the lenses inside the compound lens but is established by the location of the aperture stop in the lens. The aperture stop selects the rays that are passed through the lens and the specific selection is what makes a lens telecentric.

If a lens is not telecentric, it is either entocentric or hypercentric. Common lenses are usually entocentric. In particular, a single lens  without a separate aperture stop is entocentric. For such a lens the chief ray originating at any point off of the optical axis is never parallel to the optical axis, neither in front of nor behind the lens.
A non-telecentric lens exhibits varying magnification for objects at different distances from the lens. An entocentric lens has a smaller magnification for objects farther away; objects of the same size appear smaller the farther they are away. A hypercentric lens produces larger images the farther the object is away.

A telecentric lens can be object-space telecentric, image-space telecentric, or bi-telecentric (also double-telecentric). In an object-space telecentric lens the image size does not change with the object distance, and in an image-space telecentric lens the image size does not change with the image-side distance from the lens.

Object-space telecentric lenses

An object-space telecentric lens has the entrance pupil at infinity and provides an orthographic projection instead of the perspective projection in an entocentric lens.
Object-space telecentric lenses have a working distance. Objects at this distance are in focus and imaged sharply onto the image sensor at flange focal distance in the camera.
An object that is closer or farther is out of focus and may be blurry, but will be the same size regardless of distance.

Telecentric lenses tend to be larger, heavier, and more expensive than normal lenses of similar focal length and f-number. This is partly due to the extra components needed to achieve telecentricity, and partly because the first element in an object-space telecentric lens must be at least as large as the largest object to be imaged. The front element in an object-space telecentric lens is often much larger than the camera mount. In contrast to entocentric lenses where lenses are made larger to increase the aperture for increased collection of light or shallower depth of field, a larger diameter (but otherwise similar) object-space telecentric lens is not faster than a smaller lens. Because of their intended applications, telecentric lenses often have higher resolution and transmit more light than normal photographic lenses.

Commercial object-space telecentric lenses are often characterized by their magnification, working distance and maximum image circle or image sensor size. A truly telecentric lens has no focus ring to adjust the position of the focal plane. Some commercial telecentric lenses, however, do feature a focus ring. This can be used to slightly adjust the working distance and magnification while losing a little bit of telecentricity. Sometimes, manufacturers specify a sensor resolution or pixel size to describe the optical quality of the lens and the maximum optical resolution it can achieve due to the lens's aberrations.

Because their images have constant magnification and constant viewing angle across the field of view, object-space telecentric lenses are used for metrology applications, where a machine vision system must determine the precise size and shape of objects independently from their exact distance and position within the field of view.

In order to optimize the telecentric effect when objects are illuminated from behind, an additional image-space telecentric lens can be used as a telecentric (or collimated) illuminator, which produces a parallel light flow, often from LED sources.

Image-space telecentric lenses

An image-space telecentric lens has the exit pupil at infinity and produces images of the same size regardless of the distance between the lens and the film or image sensor. This allows the lens to be focused to different distances without changing the size of the image. An image-space telecentric lens is a reversed object-space telecentric lens, and vice versa.

Since the chief rays after an image-space telecentric lens are always parallel to the optical axis, these lenses are often used in applications that are sensitive to the angle of incidence. Interference-based color-selective beam splitters or filters but also Fabry–Pérot interferometers are two examples where image-space telecentricity is used.  Another example is minimizing crosstalk between pixels in image sensors and maximizing the quantum efficiency of a sensor. The Four Thirds System initially required image-space telecentric lenses, but with the improvement of sensors, the angle of incidence requirement has been relaxed. 
Since every pixel is illuminated at the same angle by an image-space telecentric lens, they are also used for radiometric and color measurement applications, where one would need the irradiance to be the same regardless of the field position.

Bi-telecentric lenses

In a bi-telecentric (or double-telecentric) lens, both entrance and exit pupil are at infinity. The magnification is constant despite variations of both the distance of the object and the image sensor from the lens, allowing for more precise measurements than with a mono-telecentric lens. 
A bi-telecentric lens is afocal as the image of an object at infinity formed by the first part of the lens is collimated by the second part.

Commercial bi-telecentric lenses are often optimized for very low image distortion and field curvature for accurate measurements across the entire field of view at great resolution. These lenses often comprise more than 10 elements.

Large and heavy bi-telecentric lenses with many elements are commonly used in optical lithography copying a template onto semiconductor wafers.

References 

Optical microscope components
Photographic lenses
Machine vision